Pilea victoriae is a plant species discovered by a team of botanists from the Government Victoria College, Palakkad,
Kerala. The species is named after  its type location Government Victoria College, Palakkad in honor of its services to the education sector of the state. It is distinguished from the similar P. microphylla by its erect stem and its branching from the base.

References

victoriae